Peter Blazincic (born 29 May 1969), is an Australian former football (soccer) goalkeeper, now the goalkeeping coach at A-League side Adelaide United FC.

He used to play for Guangzhou Apollo in Chinese Jia-A League and is regarded as one of the best foreign players in Guangzhou football history.

References

External links
 OzFootball Profile
 

1969 births
Living people
Australian soccer players
Australian expatriate soccer players
National Soccer League (Australia) players
Guangzhou F.C. players
West Adelaide SC players
Expatriate footballers in China
Australian people of Croatian descent
Australian expatriate sportspeople in China
Association football goalkeepers